The Vâlcan Mountains are a chain of mountains in the Southern Carpathians in Gorj County, Romania. They are part of the Retezat-Godeanu Mountains group. The mountains run the length of the Jiu Valley, and serve as a barrier to entry on the southern side of the valley.

References

External links
 — the regional web portal host, with maps and information of the Vâlcan Mountains and surrounding region.

Mountain ranges of Romania
Mountain ranges of the Southern Carpathians